Hermann Greulich (9 April 1842, Breslau - 8 November 1925), was a Swiss socialist politician. Greulich was a pioneer of the international socialist movement. He worked side by side with Karl Marx and Friedrich Engels in the First International, and was later active in the Second International.

Greulich died 1925 in Zürich.

References
https://www.wien.gv.at/wiki/index.php/Hermann-Greulich-Platz
http://www.whoswho.de/bio/hermann-greulich.html

1842 births
1925 deaths
Politicians from Wrocław
People from the Province of Silesia
Social Democratic Party of Switzerland politicians
Members of the National Council (Switzerland)
Members of the International Workingmen's Association